Nanyang Jiangying Airport  is an airport serving the city of Nanyang in Henan Province, China. The airport was opened in October 1992 and expanded in 1998. It is currently undergoing another phase of expansion.

Facilities

History
The original Nanyang Airport was built in April 1934 and occupied by the Japanese during World War II. After the war it was used as a military airport with some civil flights. In October 1992 the new Jiangying Airport was built at the current location with an investment of 77 million yuan, and the old airport was closed. Scheduled flights to Guangzhou, Shanghai, and Beijing started in 2004.

Airlines and destinations

See also
List of airports in China
List of the busiest airports in China

References

External links
Official web site

Airports in Henan
Airports established in 1992
1992 establishments in China
Buildings and structures in Nanyang, Henan